{{DISPLAYTITLE:C23H22FN3O}}
The molecular formula C23H22FN3O (molar mass: 375.44 g/mol, exact mass: 375.1747 u) may refer to:

 Elopiprazole
 5F-PCN, also called 5F-MN-21